The Legal Profession Act 2004 is an Act of the Parliament of Victoria which outlines the accreditation requirements for the legal profession in the Australian state of Victoria.

References

Victoria (Australia) legislation
2004 in Australian law
2000s in Victoria (Australia)